Strabo ('squinter') was a term given by the Romans to anyone whose eyes were distorted or crooked or affected by strabismus.

People
 Strabo, Greek historian and geographer (c. 64 BC–24 AD), the most famous figure bearing this name
 Pompeius Strabo (d. 87 BC), Roman consul and general, father of Pompey the Great
 Gaius Julius Caesar Strabo Vopiscus (c. 130 BC–87 BC), Roman politician and playwright
 Lucius Seius Strabo (46 BC–16 AD), Praetorian prefect and father of Sejanus
 Walahfrid Strabo (c. 808–849),  Frankish theologian
 Theodoric Strabo (d. 481), Ostrogoth chieftain

In fiction
 Landover (Magic Kingdom)#Strabo, a dragon in the Magic Kingdom of Landover series of fantasy novels

Places
Strabo (crater), a lunar crater